Repository may refer to:

Archives and online databases
 Content repository, a database with an associated set of data management tools, allowing application-independent access to the content
 Disciplinary repository (or subject repository), an online archive containing works or data associated with a particular subject area
 HAL (open archive), an open archive where authors can deposit academic documents
 Information repository, a central place in which an aggregation of data is kept and maintained in an organized way, usually in computer storage
 Institutional repository, an archive for keeping digital copies of the intellectual output of an institution
 Open-access repository, a platform for freely available research results

Publications 
 The Repository, a newspaper in Ohio
 Ackermann's Repository, a British periodical published 1809–1829

Software 
 Repository (version control), a data structure which stores metadata for a set of files or directory structure
 Software repository, a storage location for software packages

See also